Annaka Harris (née Gorton, born 1976) is an American author. Her work touches on neuroscience, meditation, philosophy of mind and consciousness. She is the author of the New York Times bestseller Conscious: A Brief Guide to the Fundamental Mystery of the Mind (2019) and the children's book I Wonder (2013).

Biography
Harris was the co-founder of the non-profit scientific education group Project Reason in 2007. She edited the 2011 long-form essay and book Lying by her husband Sam Harris. She is the author of the 2013 children's book I Wonder, which is about uncertainty and the nature of reality. She wrote the 2019 New York Times bestselling science book Conscious: A Brief Guide to the Fundamental Mystery of the Mind. Key subjects of Conscious include free will, panpsychism and the hard problem of consciousness.

Harris has been married to atheist and philosopher Sam Harris since 2004. The couple have two daughters.

References

External links

American science writers
American editors
Living people
1976 births